De Blasio is a surname of people including:

Antonio De Blasio (born 1955), Hungarian politician 
Bill de Blasio (born 1961), American politician

See also

Raúl Di Blasio (born 1949), Argentine pianist
Blasio (disambiguation)

Italian-language surnames